Elkland Township may refer to the following places in the United States:

 Elkland Township, Michigan
 Elkland Township, Sullivan County, Pennsylvania

See also 
 Elk Township (disambiguation)

Township name disambiguation pages